Deng may refer to:

 Deng (company), is a Danish engineering, electrical, solar power and sales company in Accra, Ghana
 Deng (state), an ancient Chinese state 
 Deng (Chinese surname), originated from the state
 Deng Xiaoping, paramount leader of China 1978-1989
Deng (Sudanese name)
 Deng (ethnic group), an ethnic group of Tibet
 Another name for the Mayan god Denka
 Doctor of Engineering degree, D.Eng.
 the sky god of the Dinka religion
 an alien race from the Bolo universe

See also 
 Dengue fever
 Denge (disambiguation)